Ormanpınar is a village in the Baykan District of Siirt Province in Turkey. The village had a population of 386 in 2021.

References 

Kurdish settlements in Siirt Province
Villages in Baykan District